Rebecca Passler (born August 31, 2001) is an Italian biathlete. She competes in the Biathlon World Cup, where she debuted at 2021–22 season.

Passler excelled in junior competitions, winning numerous medals at the Junior World Championships. On November 27, 2021, she made her World Cup debut, finishing 94th in the individual race. Passler placed 17th in the sprint competition on December 3, 2022, scoring first points.

Her uncle Johann Passler is a former biathlete as well.

References

External links

2001 births
Living people
Italian female biathletes
Sportspeople from Bruneck